Dagdi Chawl is a neighbourhood in Byculla, Mumbai, used to house mill workers from the nearby industries.  Now it is known for the fortified home of mafia don turned politician Arun Gawli. On 2 October 2015, a Marathi film starring Ankush Choudhary, Makarand Deshpande and Pooja Sawant has been released by the name Daagdi Chawl which showcases 1995-96 gang war.

References

Neighbourhoods in Mumbai